David A Hubbard (born September 29, 1955) is a former college and professional American football player who is now a speaker and author on health and fitness. From 2013 to 2017 he was a pastor on staff at the Church of The Apostles in Atlanta, Georgia. Hubbard is presently Athletic Director and Director of Development for The Cumberland School, a private Christian school in Cobb County, Georgia.

Early life
Hubbard grew up in Napa, California where he was a member of the first graduating class of Vintage High School. In 1973, he received a full athletic scholarship to Brigham Young University, where he played offensive tackle and guard under LaVell Edwards. During his time at BYU, Hubbard played in the Fiesta Bowl and in the Senior Bowl.

Career
Hubbard was drafted by the New Orleans Saints in the fifth round and played for the team in 1977 under coachHank Stram and also played for the Denver Broncos during short stint. After football, his playing weight combined with a serious back injury from a near fatal accident made it difficult to get and stay physically fit. In 1989, Hubbard began traveling extensively as a motivational speaker to corporate America on how to get fit for life. During those years Hubbard discovered that the greatest obstacle to personal fitness is time. He then began developing his unique approach to exercise, determined to come up with a simple fitness formula that would overcome the common obstacles and excuses keeping most people from getting and staying physically fit.

Publishing career
In 2000 Hubbard was awarded a U.S. patent for his unique exercise method. He calls himself "America's Fitness Coach" and provides fitness advice in online articles and on television. His most recently published book is BAD CHUTE! Why most Americans fail with fitness..

Personal life
Hubbard has been married twice. His first marriage lasted 16 years and produced four children. His second and current marriage to his wife Melinda produced two more children.  Hubbard and his wife live in Marietta, Georgia

References

1955 births
Living people
People from Napa, California
BYU Cougars football players
New Orleans Saints players